Faisal Zayid Al-Harbi  (born 9 October 1991) is a Kuwaiti professional footballer who plays as a midfielder for Al-Kuwait SC.

International career

International goals
Scores and results list Kuwait's goal tally first.

Honors
 VIVA Premier League Player of the Month: October 2017

External links

References

1991 births
Living people
Kuwaiti footballers
Kuwait international footballers
Association football midfielders
2015 AFC Asian Cup players
Najran SC players
Sportspeople from Kuwait City
Saudi Professional League players
Kuwait SC players
Al-Nahda Club (Oman) players
Kuwait Premier League players
Al Jahra SC players
Oman Professional League players
Expatriate footballers in Oman
Expatriate footballers in Saudi Arabia
Kuwaiti expatriate sportspeople in Oman
Kuwaiti expatriate sportspeople in Saudi Arabia
Kuwaiti expatriate footballers